High diving at the 2019 World Aquatics Championships was held between 22 and 24 July 2019.

Schedule
Two events were held.

All time are local (UTC+9).

Medal summary

Medal table

Medal events

References

External links
Official website 

 
High diving
2019
High diving at the World Aquatics Championships
Diving competitions in South Korea